The Expedition of the Family Fox is a 2021 Dutch family film directed by Bob Wilbers. The film was entirely shot in the Dutch amusement park De Efteling. The film premiered at the Molodist International Film Festival in Kyiv.  The film was put on a shortlist of 22 films eligible for the Golden Calves, an award often called the Dutch equivalent of the Oscars.

Plot
A recently deceased grandfather leaves a scavenger hunt for a young boy to follow.

Reception
Dutch newspaper found De Telegraaf it a shame that the film suffered from the Coronacrisis and therefor didn't get as big of a movie theatre release as it deserved.

CineMagazine rated it 3 stars.

References

External links 
 

Dutch children's films
2020s Dutch-language films
Dutch adventure films
Films directed by Bob Wilbers